Alycia is a female given name. The name is variant of Alicia, a form of Alice, and is ultimately from the Germanic name Adalheidis (Adelaide), meaning "noble-kind".

People
 Alycia Debnam-Carey, Australian actress
 Alycia Delmore, American actress
 Alycia Dias, Pakistani playback singer
 Alycia Halladay, Chief Science Officer at the Autism Science Foundation
 Alycia Lane, American television journalist
 Alycia Moulton, retired American professional tennis player

Fictional characters
 Alycia, character in the British film The Voice of Merrill

See also
 Alicia, Alisha and Leisha, variant forms of the name
 Alicia (disambiguation), other meanings

References

Feminine given names